Ridley School District is a large, suburban public school district in southeastern Delaware County, Pennsylvania. It serves the residents of Ridley Township, and the boroughs of Ridley Park and Eddystone. Ridley School District encompasses approximately 8 square miles. According to 2000 federal census data, Ridley School District served a resident population of 40,429. 

In 2009, the district residents’ per capita income was $21,563, while the median family income was $56,201. In the Commonwealth, the median family income was $49,501 and the United States median family income was $49,445, in 2010.

The district has one high school, one middle school, and seven elementary schools.

Extracurriculars
The district offers a variety of clubs, activities and sports. Ridley School District uses a Green Raider as their mascot. The Raiders referred to Native Americans from the Lenni Lenape Nation. In the summer of 2020, a movement organized by students at Ridley High School (called Diversify Our Narrative) took action to change the controversial mascot; however, they have yet to yield any results.

Ridley High School is home to the WRSD radio station.

References

External links
 

School districts in Delaware County, Pennsylvania
School districts established in 1967
1967 establishments in Pennsylvania